Gerhard Wahrig (10 May 1923 in Burgstädt, Saxony, Germany – 2 September 1978 in Wiesbaden Hesse, Germany) was a German linguist and lexicographer. He also worked on semantics and grammar.

His main work is the Deutsches Wörterbuch (German Dictionary, also referred to as Der Wahrig, 1st edition in 1966), which is still published today.

References

1923 births
1978 deaths
People from Burgstädt
Linguists from Germany
20th-century linguists